Peltaria alliacea, or garlic cress, is a perennial plant in the family Brassicaceae, endemic to Southeastern Europe. The plant is glabrous (hairless) with simple, entire leaves. The leaves are ovate, sessile and amplexicaule (having lobes that completely surround the stem). When crushed they smell of garlic, hence the common name. Its chromosome number is 2n=14 (also: 28, 56).

It was first published and described by Nikolaus Joseph von Jacquin in 'Enum. Stirp. Vindob.' on page 260 in May 1762.

The plant grows in stony areas from Southern Austria (Styria, Lower Austria) to South Romania and Albania. It has become naturalized in the U.K.

The plant is also grown as a herb or vegetable. The leaves can be used and add a spiciness to salads. Although, they can become bitter in the summer.

References

External links

Brassicaceae
Plants described in 1762
Flora of Europe
Flora of Austria
Flora of Romania
Flora of Albania
Taxa named by Nikolaus Joseph von Jacquin